Carry On Girls is a 1973 British comedy film, the 25th release in the series of 31 Carry On films (1958–1992). The film features regulars Sid James, Barbara Windsor, Joan Sims, Kenneth Connor, Bernard Bresslaw and Peter Butterworth. This Carry On featured neither Kenneth Williams nor Charles Hawtrey; Williams was unavailable and Hawtrey had been dropped from the series.

Patsy Rowlands makes her seventh appearance in the series. Robin Askwith makes his only appearance in the series. Jack Douglas makes his third appearance, this time upgraded to a main role. This is the final of six Carry On films for Valerie Leon and Jimmy Logan makes the second of his two Carry On appearances.

Plot
The seaside town of Fircombe is facing a crisis – it's always raining and there's nothing for the tourists to do. Councillor Sidney Fiddler (Sid James) hits on the notion of holding a beauty contest. The mayor, Frederick Bumble (Kenneth Connor), is taken with the idea but feminist councillor Augusta Prodworthy (June Whitfield) is outraged and storms out of the meeting. The motion is carried in Augusta's absence, and Sidney contacts publicist Peter Potter (Bernard Bresslaw) to help with the organisation.

Sidney's girlfriend, Connie Philpotts (Joan Sims), runs a local hotel and soon her residents—including the eccentric Mrs Dukes (Joan Hickson) and the randy old Admiral (Peter Butterworth)—are outnumbered by putative models, including diminutive biker Hope Springs (Barbara Windsor) and tall, buxom Dawn Brakes (Margaret Nolan). A catfight orchestrated by Hope after thinking Dawn has stolen her bikini provides better newspaper copy than bringing a donkey off the beach which, despite the bucket and spade of hotel porter, William (Jack Douglas), ruins the plush carpets. Augusta's son, press photographer Larry (Robin Askwith), is hired to document the donkey stunt and snaps the catfight that has the Mayor losing his trousers, then gulps his way through a nude photo shoot with Dawn. The Mayor's wife, Mildred (Patsy Rowlands), joins Prodworthy's bra-burning movement and plots the downfall of the Miss Fircombe contest on the pier. Peter Potter reluctantly becomes a man in a frock for another publicity gimmick for the television show Women's Things, presented by Cecil Gaybody (Jimmy Logan) and produced by Debra (Sally Geeson). Prodworthy and butch feminist Rosemary (Patricia Franklin) call in the police (David Lodge and Billy Cornelius) to investigate the male pageant contestant but Peter's previously prim girlfriend, Paula (Valerie Leon), has a makeover and turns out to be very buxom and glamorous. and steps into the breach as the mysterious girl.

Prodworthy's gang put "Operation Spoilsport" into action, sabotaging the final contest with water, mud and itching powder. With an angry mob after his blood, Sidney makes his escape on a go-kart, finds Connie has taken all the money and then speeds away with Hope on her motorcycle.

Certification
The film marked a slightly more risqué treatment of the topic with more nudity and openly sexual jokes than previous films. Discreet cuts by the BBFC (mainly to saucy dialogue and the hotel fight sequence between bikini-clad contestants played by Barbara Windsor and Margaret Nolan) enabled the film to gain the more commercially acceptable A certificate (open to families) than the more restrictive AA certificate, barring entry to the under-fourteens.

Cast

Sid James as Sidney Fiddler
Barbara Windsor as Hope Springs (real name Muriel Bloggs)
Joan Sims as Connie Philpotts
Kenneth Connor as Mayor Frederick Bumble
Bernard Bresslaw as Peter Potter
Peter Butterworth as Admiral
June Whitfield as Augusta Prodworthy
Jack Douglas as William
Patsy Rowlands as Mildred Bumble
Joan Hickson as Mrs Dukes
David Lodge as Police Inspector
Valerie Leon as Paula Perkins
Margaret Nolan as Dawn Brakes
Angela Grant as Miss Bangor
Sally Geeson as Debra
Jimmy Logan as Cecil Gaybody
Wendy Richard as Ida Downes
Arnold Ridley as Alderman Pratt
Robin Askwith as Larry

Patricia Franklin as Rosemary
Brian Osborne as "Half a quid" citizen
Bill Pertwee as Fire chief
Marianne Stone as Miss Drew
Brenda Cowling as Matron
Zena Clifton as Susan Brooks
Laraine Humphrys as Eileen Denby
Pauline Peart as Gloria Winch
Caroline Whitaker as Mary Parker
Barbara Wise as Julia Oates
Carol Wyler as Maureen Darcy
Mavis Fyson as Frances Cake
Billy Cornelius as Constable (uncredited)
Edward Palmer as Elderly resident (uncredited)
Michael Nightingale as City gent (uncredited)
Hugh Futcher as "There's Fiddler" citizen (uncredited)
Elsie Winsor as Cloakroom attendant (uncredited)
Nick Hobbs as Stunt double (uncredited)
Ron Tarr as Bearded man in audience (uncredited)

Crew
Screenplay – Talbot Rothwell
Music – Eric Rogers
Production Manager – Roy Goddard
Art Director – Robert Jones
Director of Photography – Alan Hume
Editor – Alfred Roome
Camera Operator – Jimmy Devis
Assistant Director – Jack Causey
Sound Recordists – Paul Lemare & Ken Barker
Continuity – Marjorie Lavelly
Make-up – Geoffrey Rodway
Hairdresser – Stella Rivers
Costume Design – Courtenay Elliott
Set Dresser – Kenneth MacCallum Tait
Dubbing Editor – Patrick Foster
Assistant Editor – Jack Gardner
Title Sketches – Larry
Titles – GSE Ltd
Processor – Rank Film Laboratories
Producer – Peter Rogers
Director – Gerald Thomas

Filming and locations

Filming dates – 16 April-25 May 1973

Interiors:
 Pinewood Studios, Buckinghamshire

Exteriors:
 Brighton's West Pier. (The Palace Pier had been used a couple of years earlier in Carry On at Your Convenience)
 Slough Town Hall, Slough, Berkshire
 Clarges Hotel, Brighton
 Brighton Beach, Brighton
 Marylebone Railway Station, London

Notes
An early version of the script featured Kenneth Williams in the role of Mayor Bumble which would ultimately be played by Kenneth Connor in the finished film. Williams was appearing in a West End play, My Fat Friend. The role of Cecil Gaybody was written for Charles Hawtrey, however he had been dropped due to his unreliability. It was then offered to Kenneth Williams, who turned it down because of stage commitments.

Valerie Leon's voice for the film was dubbed by co-star June Whitfield.

Clarges Hotel would later be owned by actress Dora Bryan who had appeared in the first Carry On, Carry On Sergeant. The hotel was  previously used (exterior only) in the 1971 film Carry On at Your Convenience.

References

Bibliography

Keeping the British End Up: Four Decades of Saucy Cinema by Simon Sheridan (third edition) (2007) (Reynolds & Hearn Books)

External links

Carry On Girls at The Whippit Inn

1973 films
Girls
1970s English-language films
Films directed by Gerald Thomas
1973 comedy films
Films set in Brighton
Films shot at Pinewood Studios
Films about beauty pageants
Films produced by Peter Rogers
Films with screenplays by Talbot Rothwell
1970s British films